Baaghi (Rebel) is a drama serial that premiered on Urdu 1 on July 27th of 2017. 

The show is based on the life of, controversial Pakistani actress Qandeel Baloch who was murdered by her brother in the name of honor in July 2016. 

The screenplay of this drama has been done by Umera Ahmed. Saba Qamar plays the lead character of Fauzia/Qandeel in the series. Within a week of its launch, Baaghi became the most watched serial being viewed by Pakistanis on YouTube and has also been the limelight of controversies, as expected. The drama is one of the most hyped TV serials ever produced in Pakistan.

Plot
Fauzia Batool, a beautiful young girl, lives in a village house with her parents and siblings. Fauzia has a younger brother, a younger sister, and an elder brother, Rahim, who is married to Asma. Fauzia's older sister Nazia is married and faces domestic abuse regularly. 

Fauzia's sister-in-law, Asma, is manipulative and completely controls her husband. Asma's brother Sajid falls in love with Fauzia and compels Asma to ask for her hand. Asma is firmly against their marriage as she does not want her brother to marry such a 'sharp' woman. Sajid manages to convince his sister, who, in turn, convinces Rahim, and that too very quickly. Rahim and Asma talk to Fauzia's parents about the proposal. Fauzia's parents are initially reluctant but succumb to Rahim and Sajid's mother's pressure and eventually confirm the proposal. However, Fauzia rejects the proposal because Sajid is a lazy, jobless person who would sit on the road all day doing nothing. Fauzia dreams of becoming famous and independent. Hence marrying Sajid would derail her dreams. But Fauzia's family tells her that it is too late to refuse the marriage as the village knows about it.

Fauzia falls in love with Abid, the cosmetic shop owner in her neighbourhood who recently returned from Dubai. Abid promises to allow and help Fauzia to accomplish all her dreams and gives her many magazines of models. Fauzia's parents reject Abid's proposal. Her wedding day with Sajid arrives, but she escapes right before the ceremony.

Fauzia and Abid get married. However, Abid loses interest in Fauzia after their marriage. Soon, they have a son. Fauzia discovers that Abid has an affair with Ruby, leading to conflict between Fauzia and Abid. Abid physically abuses Fauzia. He divorces her and throws her out of his house. Devastated, she leaves the village and travels to Karachi to be a model. The agency Fauzia works for sends her a beautician, Gogi/Rehaan, who gives her a makeover and improves her English.

Meanwhile, Abid, who has divorced Fauzia, marries Ruby and gives his sister legal custody of his child. Fauzia faces exploitation at the hands of her employer and the owner of the women's hostel where she lives. Unable to find new work, Fauzia returns to her ex-boss, Gauhar, and agrees to work on Gauhar's terms to earn money. She starts uploading her videos on social media with the name Kanwal. She gains a lot of fan following as well as bashing and haters. 

Fauzia meets Shehryar, a widower who lost his wife and daughter in an accident a few years ago. They eventually fall in love, but Fauzia does not tell him about her marriage, divorce or son. Fauzia finally reconciles with her family. Fauzia is ready to marry Shehryar and leave behind the world of glamour. 

Fauzia's life turns upside down when a TV channel reveals Kanwal's true identity. The channel airs her ex-husband's video, where he accuses Fauzia of abandoning her son for the sake of her ambition. Though initially upset, Shehryar gives Fauzia a chance to explain her side of the story. Shehryar is touched hearing about Fauzia's struggle.

Fauzia's younger brother, who has become a drug addict, is mocked by his friends and peers for having a reckless sister. He drugs her and then strangles her in her semi-conscious state. Fauzia's whole life flashes before her eyes as she makes feeble attempts to free herself. Eventually, she dies, and her brother runs away. The following day her younger sister finds her dead body in the room. The news soon spreads like wildfire, and the media breaks the news, which ultimately reaches Sheheryar, who is also numb with grief. Fauzia's brother gets arrested for her murder.

Cast 
 Saba Qamar as Fauzia Batool/ Kanwal Baloch
 Aliee Shaikh as Gohar 
 Osman Khalid Butt as Shahreyar Hasan (Kanwal's love interest)
 Khalid Malik as Rehaan (Kanwal's best friend)
 Ali Kazmi as Abid (Fauzia's husband) 
 Sarmad Khoosat as Raheem (Fauzia's elder brother)
 Irfan Khoosat as Fauzia's father
 Saba Faisal as Fauzia's mother
 Nimra Khan as Munni Fauzia's younger sister 
 Nadia Afgan as Asma (Fauzia's sister-in-law)
 Seemi Raheel as Abid's mother
 Syed Tabrez Ali Shah as Munna Fauzia's younger brother
 Farah Tufail as Fauzia's sister
 Syed Babrik Shah
 Laila Zuberi as Shehreyar's mother
 Mani
 Tahir Jatoi
 Sophia Mirza
 Tahir Latif Saqi
 Farhana Maqsood as Abid's second wife
 Muskan Jay as Abid's sister
 Rabia Noreen as Samreen

Cameo appearances 
 Yasir Hussain as Sohail Warraich
 Yasir Nawaz
 Ali Saqi 
 Hareem Farooq as a Pakistan Idol Judge
 Goher Mumtaz as a Pakistan Idol Judge
 Nomi Ansari as a Pakistan Idol Judge
 Hira Tareen
 Naeem Tahir
 Ismat Zaidi as Chaudhrani Ji
 Ahmed Godil
 Hasan Soomro
 Farooq Rind

Awards and nominations

Release

Broadcast
Baaghi was originally broadcast on Urdu1 from 27 July 2017 to 1 February 2018.

In 2022, it aired in India on Zindagi.

References

External links

Baaghi on Official website

Urdu 1
Pakistani drama television series
2010s romantic drama television series
2017 Pakistani television series debuts
2017 Pakistani television series endings
Urdu-language television shows
Works about honor killing